Jacqueline Wiles (born July 13, 1992) is a World Cup alpine ski racer from the United States. Born in Portland, Oregon, she specializes in the speed events of downhill and super-G.

A graduate of Canby High School, Wiles made her World Cup debut in November 2013 and gained her first podium in January 2017 in downhill at Altenmarkt-Zauchensee. She has competed for the U.S. in two Winter Olympics (2014, 2022), and three World Championships.

World Cup results

Season standings

Top ten finishes

 2 podiums – (2 DH)

World Championship results

Olympic results

References

External links 

 
 
 
 Jacqueline Wiles at Rossignol Skis
 Jacqueline Wiles at U.S. Ski Team
 

1992 births
Living people
Alpine skiers at the 2014 Winter Olympics
Alpine skiers at the 2022 Winter Olympics
American female alpine skiers
Olympic alpine skiers of the United States
Sportspeople from Portland, Oregon
21st-century American women